Hush ... Not A Word To Mary was the second UK hit for New Zealand singer John Rowles. It was the follow up release to his major hit  If I Only Had Time.

Background
The song was written by Mitch Murray and Peter Callander. Mike Leander was the producer and arranger. The B side "The Night We Called It A Day" was written by John Rowles and Steve Kipner.
It was published by Intune, which was the new publishing company for Murray and Callender. By July 6, the single shot up 18 places from #36 to #18. By July 13, 1968, the single had moved from its previous position of #18 to #12.
This single also marked the last of Rowles's s chart success in the UK.

References

John Rowles songs
1968 singles
1968 songs
MCA Records singles
Songs written by Mitch Murray
Songs written by Peter Callander
Song recordings produced by Mike Leander